UCLA Lab School is the laboratory school of the UCLA School of Education & Information Studies (Ed&IS). Located on UCLA's main Westwood campus since the 1950s, it currently serves 450 students ranging in ages from 4 to 12.

Founded as a demonstration school for the Los Angeles branch of the California State Normal School in 1882, the school was previously known as University Elementary School (1929-1982) and Corinne A. Seeds University Elementary School (1982-2009). The name was changed in 2009 to better convey the school's purpose as a laboratory for research and innovation in education. CONNECT, an onsite research center, allows educators and researchers to explore ideas about teaching, learning and child development.

History
UCLA Lab School was founded in 1882 as the demonstration school of the California State Normal School at Los Angeles. Located on the site of today’s Central Library in downtown Los Angeles, the Normal School prepared teachers for educating the growing city. By 1914, enrollment had far exceeded capacity, so the Normal School and the children's school moved to a Hollywood campus off a dirt road that later became Vermont Avenue. In 1919, the regents approved the establishment of the “Southern Branch of the University of California,” which expanded and became the University of California at Los Angeles in 1927. With the university's move to Westwood in 1929, the children's school began leasing property owned by Los Angeles City Schools east of the main UCLA campus on Warner Avenue. 

The children’s school was called University Elementary School (UES) and was led by principal Corinne A. Seeds. An educator heavily influenced by the teachings of John Dewey, Seeds became a key figure in developing and promoting progressive education during the 1930s, '40s and '50s. She believed that "to keep education dynamic, children must have experiences that they care about." 

In 1945, the university lost its lease on the Warner Avenue location and left the site the following year. From September 1946 to June 1947, UES was without a schoolhouse, but some classes continued in private homes. Supporters of Seeds and progressive education successfully lobbied the state legislature to fund a relocation onto the UCLA campus. While World War II restrictions prevented building efforts, supporters found unused army barracks and transferred them to the Westwood campus to be used as a temporary school facility.

The first permanent school buildings for the elementary school were completed in 1950 and designed by architects Robert Alexander and Richard Neutra. The architects worked closely with Seeds and other members of the school community to promote children’s movement and exploration through the integration of indoor and outdoor space and flexible configurations of the learning environment.

Over the decades, UES has been led by directors and principals that include John Goodlad, Madeline Hunter and Deborah Stipek. In 1982, the school was renamed the Corinne A. Seeds University Elementary School. In 2009, the UCLA Lab School name took hold on the Corinne A. Seeds Campus.

Notable alumni
 Leonardo DiCaprio – actor
 Derek Bok – lawyer, educator, and former president of Harvard University
Andrea Fay Friedman – Actress
 Eric Garcetti – politician, Mayor of Los Angeles
 Kim Gordon – musician, Sonic Youth
 Alex Greenwald – lead singer of Phantom Planet
 Emma Walton Hamilton – actress and author of children's books
 Henry McHenry – biological anthropologist
 Jason Schwartzman – actor and musician
 Earl Sweatshirt – rapper, record producer, skateboarder, musician, and former member of Los Angeles-based hip hop collective Odd Future

References

Bibliography

External links 
 UCLA Lab School

Lab School
University-affiliated schools in the United States
Schools in Los Angeles
Public elementary schools in California
Public middle schools in California
Public high schools in California
1882 establishments in California